Väinjärve is a village in Järva Parish, Järva County in northern-central Estonia.

General Hugo Kauler (1893–1942) was born in Väinjärve.

Väinjärve manor
Väinjärve estate was established after 1663. The current building is from the 1860s and built in a historicist style with an eight-sided tower.

Johann von Michelsohnen, the first Russian General of Estonian descent, was born on the estate in 1735.

References

External links
Väinjärve manor at Estonian Manors Portal

Villages in Järva County
Manor houses in Estonia
Kreis Jerwen